The Office of the Fairness Commissioner is an arm's length Crown agency of the Government of Ontario that is responsible for ensuring that Ontarians with professional credentials from foreign countries can have fair access to regulated professions and trades in Ontario. 

The office is independent of the regulated professions and the government. It was created by the Fair Access to Regulated Professions Act, which came into effect on 1 March 2007.

List of commissioners
Jean Augustine, 2007–2015
Mary Shenstone, 2015–2016
Grant Jameson, 2017–2019
Irwin Glasberg, 2020–present

See also
 Criticism of Canada relating to foreign credentials
 Ministry of Citizenship and Immigration (Ontario)

References

External links
 

Ontario government departments and agencies
2006 establishments in Ontario
Government agencies established in 2006

Immigration to Ontario
Migration-related organizations based in Canada